Thanks for Your Love is a 1996 Hong Kong romantic comedy film produced and directed by David Yu and Norman Law and starring Andy Lau and Rosamund Kwan.

Plot
Wah (Andy Lau) has an uninhibited romantic nature and is very optimistic. He also loves motorcycles, but he gets into a traffic accident which damages a business of the company he works for and Wah is fired as a result. Lam-lam (Rosamund Kwan) is old-fashioned and conservative. She wants to get married with his boyfriend Michael (Michael Tao), but she overreacts and gets violent when she gets intimate with a man. Because of this, Michael broke up with her. One day, Wah met Lam-lam at a reception of her company. Having lost her love, Lam-lam was determined to make a breakthrough. Using alcohol to boost her courage, Lam-lam uses her tipsiness to seduce Wah. Wah sees his love fortune coming and the two of them hook up creating a seemingly imaginary and real bewildered night.

Cast
Andy Lau as Wah
Rosamund Kwan as Lam-lam
Deanie Ip as Lam-lam's mother
Michael Tao as Michael
Anita Lee as Michael's new girlfriend
Kong Ngai as Lam-lam's father
Kung Suet-fa as Ben's girlfriend
Maria Cordero (cameo)
Sheila Chan as Nancy
Kingdom Yuen as Lam-lam's Manager
Michael Lam as Gay man on the street (cameo)
Kwan Hoi-san as Uncle Shrimp
Lee Heung-kam as Sister Kam
Power Chan
Radium Cheung
Wong Po-mei
Cha Chuen-yee as Wah's boss
Nelson Cheung as Therapist
Wong Chi-keung
Daniel Yu
Hau Woon-ling
Lee Wai-wah
Leung San
Ching Wan
Ma Wai-ling

Theme song
Tide (潮水)
Composer: Takashi Tsushini
Lyricist/Singer: Andy Lau

Box office
The film grossed HK$3,591,840 at the Hong Kong box office during its theatrical run from 26 September to 9 October 1996 in Hong Kong.

See also
Andy Lau filmography

External links

Thanks for Your Love at Hong Kong Cinemagic

Thanks for Your Love film review at LoveHKFilm.com

1996 films
1996 romantic comedy films
Hong Kong romantic comedy films
Hong Kong slapstick comedy films
1990s Cantonese-language films
Films set in Hong Kong
Films shot in Hong Kong
1996 directorial debut films
1990s Hong Kong films